Ali Qasim Mshari (born January 20, 1994) is an Iraqi professional footballer who currently plays for Amanat Baghdad in the Iraqi Premier League.

International debut
On August 14, 2013 Ali made his first international cap with Iraq against Chile in a friendly match.

Honours

International
Iraq Youth team
 2012 AFC U-19 Championship: runner-up
 2013 FIFA U-20 World Cup: 4th Place

International statistics

Iraq national under-20 team goals
Goals are correct excluding friendly matches and unrecognized tournaments such as Arab U-20 Championship.

References

External links 
 Goazz.com

Iraqi footballers
1994 births
Living people
Iraq international footballers
Association football forwards